Optimus is the sixth solo album by John Norum, the guitarist in the Swedish hard rock band Europe. It was released in 2005 on Mascot Records.

Track listing
 "Chase Down the Moon" - 3:50 (John Norum, Thomas Torberg)
 "Nailed to the Cross" - 3:32 (Norum, Fredrik Åkesson)
 "Better Day" - 3:56 (Norum, Michelle Meldrum)
 "One More Time" - 3:41 (Norum)
 "Time to Run" - 4:13 (Norum, Glenn Hughes, Meldrum, Karen Kreutzer)
 "Optimus - 3:06 (Norum, Karen Hunter)
 "Takin' the Blame" - 3:55 (Norum)
 "Change Will Come" - 3:35 (Norum)
 "Forced" - 3:37 (Norum, Åkesson)
 "Solitude" - 4:23 (Norum)
 "Natural Thing" [live] (Michael Schenker, Phil Mogg, Pete Way) - bonus track on the Japanese edition

Personnel
John Norum - Lead vocals, guitars
Mats Lindfors - Recording Engineer, Mixing, Keyboards
Fredrik Åkesson - Guitars
Thomas Torberg - Bass
Ricard "Huxflux" Nettermalm - Drums

Album credits 
John Norum - Producer

John Norum albums
2005 albums
Mascot Records albums